Hijani Himoonde also known as Hichani Himoonde (born 1 August 1986) is a Zambian former professional footballer who played as a defender. Between 2006 and 2013 he made 42 FIFA-official appearances scoring 1 goal for the Zambian national team.

Career 
Himoonde was born in Ndola.

He made his Africa Cup of Nations début against Cameroon in the 2008 Africa Cup of Nations.

In 2014, he joined South African Premier Division side Mamelodi Sundowns from TP Mazembe.

Honours 
TP Mazembe
Super Ligue: 2011, 2012, 2013
CAF Champions League: 2010
CAF Super Cup: 2010, 2011

Zambia
Africa Cup of Nations: 2012

References

External links 
 

Living people
1986 births
People from Ndola
Association football defenders
Zambian footballers
Lusaka Dynamos F.C. players
Zanaco F.C. players
ZESCO United F.C. players
TP Mazembe players
Mamelodi Sundowns F.C. players
Nkwazi F.C. players
Power Dynamos F.C. players
Zambia international footballers
2008 Africa Cup of Nations players
2010 Africa Cup of Nations players
2012 Africa Cup of Nations players
2013 Africa Cup of Nations players
Africa Cup of Nations-winning players
Zambian expatriate footballers
Expatriate footballers in the Democratic Republic of the Congo
Zambian expatriate sportspeople in the Democratic Republic of the Congo
Expatriate soccer players in South Africa
Zambian expatriate sportspeople in South Africa